Deokhangsan  is a mountain in the city of Samcheok, Gangwon-do in South Korea.

See also
List of mountains in Korea

Notes

References

Mountains of South Korea
Mountains of Gangwon Province, South Korea
One-thousanders of South Korea
zh:德顶山